The Angels Flight Stakes is an American Thoroughbred horse race held annually at Santa Anita Park in Inglewood, California.  A Grade III event open to three-year-old fillies, it is contested on dirt over a distance of a six and one-half furlongs.

Inaugurated in 1963 as the Railbird Handicap at Hollywood Park Racetrack in  Inglewood, California, it was a race for three-year-old horses of either sex until 1964 when it was changed to a race for fillies only. The event was originally named for railbirds, honoring those fans and/or handicappers who line the racetrack rail to be close to the race.

In 1965 the race was run in two divisions.

Records
Speed record:
 1:20.38 - Fantastic Style (2015)

Most wins by a jockey:
 5 - Pat Valenzuela (1986, 1994, 2002, 2004, 2005)

Most wins by a trainer:
 5 - Richard Mandella (1992, 1996, 1998, 1999, 2009)
 5 - Bob Baffert (2011, 2015, 2017, 2018, 2020)

Most wins by an owner:
 3 - Ellwood B. & Elizabeth E. Johnston  (1966, 1967, 1972)

Winners

 † 2019: Sneaking Out was disqualified from first for interfering with Miss My Rose when coming down the stretch.
 † 2000: Abby Girl finished first but was disqualified to fifth.

References

The 2009 Railbird stakes at Bloodhorse.com

Horse races in California
Flat horse races for three-year-old fillies
Santa Anita Park
Ungraded stakes races in the United States
Hollywood Park Racetrack
Previously graded stakes races in the United States
Recurring sporting events established in 1963
1963 establishments in California